Draco supriatnai is a species of agamid lizard. It is found in Indonesia.

References

Draco (genus)
Reptiles of Indonesia
Reptiles described in 2007
Taxa named by Jimmy Adair McGuire
Taxa named by Rafe M. Brown
Taxa named by Awal Riyanto